Giuseppe Lauri (born 28 May 1976) is an Italian professional boxer. A veteran of the sport for more than two decades, he held the European Union super-lightweight title from 2007 to 2010, and has challenged four times for the European super-lightweight title.

Professional career
Lauri made his professional debut on 20 December 1997, scoring a first-round stoppage over Frederic Rafhey, who also debuted. Fighting mainly in Switzerland and Italy throughout the next decade, Lauri also travelled to the UK in losing efforts against future world champions Ricky Hatton and Junior Witter. On 22 September 2006, Lauri fought for his first major regional championship—the vacant European super-lightweight title—but lost a unanimous decision to Ted Bami. In a rematch with Bami on 30 March 2007, with the same title on the line, Lauri lost again via unanimous decision.

Lauri became the European Union super-lightweight champion on 21 September 2007, stopping Michele di Rocco in seven rounds. They, too, would have a rematch many years later on 14 April 2012. In this fight, which had the now-vacant European Union super-lightweight title on the line, di Rocco stopped Lauri in the first round. During his reign as European Union champion, Lauri would score wins over contenders Peter McDonagh, Ville Piispanen and Juho Tolppola. The fight against Tolppola, on 30 May 2009, ended in a highly controversial manner when Tolppola was first disqualified after ten rounds due to repeated fouls, after which his father stormed the ring and punched the referee.

Further unsuccessful challenges for the European super-lightweight title came against Paul McCloskey on 11 June 2010 and Denis Shafikov on 23 September 2011, both via stoppage. Beginning from the rematch with di Rocco, Lauri would suffer a seven-fight losing streak which was finally ended on 24 May 2014, with a second-round stoppage win over Lajos Bimbo.

Professional boxing record

References

External links

Italian male boxers
Light-welterweight boxers
Welterweight boxers
Light-middleweight boxers
1976 births
Sportspeople from Varese
Living people
Middleweight boxers